Aaltje Grietje "Alie" Boorsma (born 22 July 1959) is a retired speed skater from the Netherlands who was active between 1979 and 1987. She competed at the 1984 Winter Olympics in the 500 and 1000 m and finished in 33rd and 23rd place, respectively. She won three national titles, allround in 1981 and 1982 and sprint allround in 1983.

Personal bests:
 500 m –  41.21 (1982)
 1000 m – 1:24.82 (1982)
 1500 m – 2:10.55 (1982)
 3000 m – 4:38.50 (1981)
 5000 m – 8:12.19 (1985)

References

1959 births
Living people
Dutch female speed skaters
Olympic speed skaters of the Netherlands
Speed skaters at the 1984 Winter Olympics
Sportspeople from Friesland
People from Drachten
21st-century Dutch women
20th-century Dutch women